Watsonville High School is a high school located in Watsonville, Santa Cruz County, California, and is part of the Pajaro Valley Unified School District. The school mascot is Willy the Wildcat. The school colors are black and gold. Watsonville High School is a large school with over 2,000 students and staff, making it the largest school in the Pajaro Valley Unified School district.

History 
Watsonville High School was originally a two-year high school course which was connected to a grammar school. The program met the standard for college entry requirements, as well as teaching Latin and Greek. In 1891, the course was extended to three years. There was an increased need for a separate building, so the district passed a bond measure to build a new two-story building, designed by W.H. Weeks, on the corner of Third and Marchant Streets.

On November 8, 1901, seven years after it was built, the school burnt to the ground. In December, a second bond measure was proposed to rebuild the school, but it failed. In February, the school district was able to pass a smaller bond to hire Weeks to build a "Spanish style" school on the foundations of the original building.

Sports 
Their most recent sports rival is Pajaro Valley High School, which is also located in Watsonville. Watsonville High's long-time rival is Aptos High School; the football game between the two schools is known as the "Black and Blue Bowl."  A new rival in many sports, is North Monterey County High School.

Baseball
Basketball
Cross Country
Fall Cheer 
Football 
Golf
Lacrosse
Soccer
Softball
Swimming and Diving
Tennis
Track and Field
Volleyball
Winter Cheer
Wrestling

Notable alumni
Luis Alejo, State Assemblymember (2010– )
Brenda Buttner, Fox News host
Sherman Cocroft, NFL player
Mark Eichhorn, MLB player
Marv Marinovich, NFL player
Tlaloc Rivas, theatre director and professor
Simon Salinas,  State Assemblymember (2000–2006)
Ken Sears, NBA player

References

External links
Official site
Pajaro Valley Unified School District website

Coalition of Essential Schools
High schools in Santa Cruz County, California
Watsonville, California
Public high schools in California
1892 establishments in California